Apti Ustarkhanov (born 28 June 1990 in Kurchaloi) is a super middleweight Russian boxer who turned pro in 2013.

Professional boxing record

References

External links
 

1990 births
Living people
Russian male boxers
Super-middleweight boxers